Karl Edward Tommy Borgudd (25 November 1946 – 23 February 2023), also known as Slim Borgudd, was a Swedish musician and Formula One driver who raced for the ATS and Tyrrell teams.

Biography
Borgudd was born in Borgholm, Öland, on 25 November 1946.

His first career was as a drummer, mainly in jazz-rock, most notably for short-lived groups Lea Riders Group, Made In Sweden and Solar Plexus. He also worked with Björn Ulvaeus's group the Hootenanny Singers and ABBA, being sponsored as a Formula One driver by the latter.

Borgudd began racing on and off in the mid 1960s with a Lotus Formula Ford car, but his racing career became more serious only in 1972, after taking five wins in five sports car racing club events. Borgudd raced a Hillman Imp and a Volvo 122 in the Swedish Touring Car Championship from 1972 to 1975, finishing as runner-up in 1972, as well as racing in the Scandinavian Formula Ford series, which he won in 1973.

In 1976, Borgudd moved up to Formula 3, racing sporadically until the end of the 1977 season. In 1978, he formed his own team and raced full-time in the Swedish and European series, in an old Ralt-Toyota, which he took to the Swedish championship title in 1979, also finishing third in the European series. Failing to move to Formula 2 in 1980, he raced only in the F3 Monaco Grand Prix, where he reached third place before the bodywork became loose, forcing Borgudd to finish the race holding the body together with one hand.

In 1981, Borgudd, now 34, finally entered Formula 1 in ATS, making his debut in the San Marino Grand Prix, where he outqualified his team-mate, Jan Lammers. Although there was no cash sponsorship, Borgudd placed the ABBA logo on the car's sidepods, a hopeful move to attract other investors that generated a lot of media interest. Following a run of non-qualifications, Borgudd managed to finish sixth in the British Grand Prix, scoring his first world championship point. In spite of the added morale boost, ATS proved to be an uncompetitive car, and Borgudd failed to score any more points for the rest of the season.

Borgudd’s performance in 1981 was solid enough to persuade Ken Tyrrell to hire him to partner Michele Alboreto for 1982. However, Borgudd did not adapt to his new team, and was unceremoniously dumped when his sponsorship money ran out three races into the season.

From 1983 to 1985, Borgudd raced only on occasion, including his taking part in the 1984 and 1985 Macau Grand Prix.

In 1985 he returned to race in F3000, which had replaced Formula 2. This championship allowed previous years Formula 1 cars, such as the Arrows A6 he drove, finishing tenth in the Vallelunga race. He entered five races that season, but the old F1 cars were not competitive compared to the purposely built F3000 cars.

Although he took part in the 1987 24 Hours of Le Mans, and in 1989 had an outright win in the Willhire 24 Hour, a minor touring car race where he drove a Ford Sierra, the Swede made his mark in truck racing the following years. In 1986 and 1987, Borgudd was champion in Divisions 2 and 3 of the European Truck Racing Championship, respectively. The following years, success was more fleeting, although the Scandinavian driver managed to finish the 1992 Class B championship in third place.

A switch to the Nordic Touring Car Championship in 1994 saw him take the championship title. The Mazda team, run by Roger Dowson Engineering made plans to return to the British Touring Car Championship in 1995 with Borgudd, but the plan was scrapped.

Also in 1994, Borgudd went back to top form in the Truck Racing Cup, where the Swede lost the race to the championship title to British driver Steve Parrish, after a dogfight that lasted the entire season. Borgudd responded in kind in 1995, beating Parrish and Markus Oestreich by a large margin. In 1996 and 1997, Borgudd only finished in fifth and fourth, and he announced his retirement after accusing Mercedes-Benz of favoring other drivers. He made occasional returns to racing at amateur level, having settled down in Coventry.

Borgudd died on 23 February 2023, at age 76.

Racing record

Complete Formula One results
(key)

Complete British Touring Car Championship results
(key) (Races in bold indicate pole position in class) (Races in italics indicate fastest lap in class)

‡ Endurance driver – not eligible for points

References

External links
Slim Borgudd's biography at F1 Rejects
Profile at Slim Racing
  as Slim
  as Tommy Borgudd
 

1946 births
2023 deaths
Swedish racing drivers
Swedish Formula One drivers
Swedish male musicians
ATS Wheels Formula One drivers
Tyrrell Formula One drivers
Swedish Formula Three Championship drivers
British Touring Car Championship drivers
International Formula 3000 drivers
ABBA
Swedish drummers
People from Borgholm Municipality